Latin theta (uppercase: , lowercase: θ) is an additional letter of the Latin script, based on the letter theta from the Greek alphabet. It is used in Cypriot Arabic, Gros Ventre, Comox, Fox, Thompson, Tuscarora, Halkomelem, Wakhi, Yavapai, Havasupai–Hualapai, and Romani. It also historically was used in Lepsius Standard Alphabet.

Usage 
The letter appears in the International Standard Alphabet of the Romani language, where it represents the voiceless alveolar plosive ([t]) when placed after a vowel, and the voiced alveolar plosive ([d]) when placed after a nasal consonant.

In the Gros Ventre, Fox, and Comox languages, it represents the voiceless dental fricative ([θ]) sound.

It was used in the Lepsius Standard Alphabet created for transcription of Egyptian hieroglyphs and African languages. In it, it represented the voiceless dental fricative ([θ]) sound, before being replaced by the letter Ṯ.

References

Bibliography 
 Hancock, Ian. A Handbook of Vlax Romani. Columbus. Slavica Publishers. 1995. ISBN 0-89357-258-6.

T| Theta, Latin